Repubblica–Teatro dell'Opera is an underground station on Line A of the Rome Metro. The station was inaugurated in 1980 and takes its name from the Piazza della Repubblica underneath which it lies.

Services
This station has:
 Escalators

Located nearby
 Piazza della Repubblica
 Fontana delle Naiadi
 Baths of Diocletian
 Santa Maria degli Angeli e dei Martiri
 National Museum of Rome
 Temple of Minerva Medica (nymphaeum)
 Teatro Costanzi (Teatro dell'Opera)
 National Theatre
 Via Nazionale
 Via Quattro Fontane
 Viminale
 Ministry of the Interior
Palazzo del Viminale
 Largo Santa Susanna
 Fontana dell'Acqua Felice o del Mosè
 Santa Susanna
 Santa Maria della Vittoria
 Ecstasy of St Theresa di Bernini
 San Bernardo alle Terme
 Via XX settembre
 Ministry of Finance
 Porta Pia

Incidents
On 23 October 2018, 20 people, mostly fans of the Russian football team CSKA, were injured by a collapsing escalator.

The station was then closed; it reopened on June 26, 2019

References

External links

 Repubblica station on the Rome public transport site (in Italian)

Rome Metro Line A stations
Railway stations opened in 1980
1980 establishments in Italy
Rome R. XVIII Castro Pretorio
Railway stations in Italy opened in the 20th century